Gary Smyth (born 20 December 1969 in Belfast), nicknamed Smickers is a Northern Irish former footballer and manager. He played as a centre back for Glentoran, Glenavon, Ballymena and Crusaders. He previously managed Glentoran in 2019 and had two spells managing H&W Welders, first from 2013–2018 and the second spell from 2019–2022.

Playing career
Smyth signed for Glentoran from Holywood in 1988, winning numerous trophies and remaining there until 1995, when he signed for Glenavon, where he enjoyed more success, before returning to The Oval in 2000. He was named as the Ulster Footballer of the Year for the 2002/03 season. In 2007, he joined Crusaders, initially on loan, and later on a permanent transfer.

He won four Irish Cup winners' medals, with Glentoran in 2004, Glenavon in 1997, and Crusaders in 2009. He retired on 9 May 2009 following the Irish Cup final.

Management career

H&W Welders (2013–2018)
Smyth was manager of H&W Welders between 2013 and 2018, proving a successful manager. He left on 23 May 2018.

Glentoran (2018–2019)
Smyth left his role at H&W Welders to join his former team Glentoran, which was officially announced on 24 May 2018. He initially joined as an assistant manager to the incoming Ronnie McFall, where the future plan was to promote him when he had all necessary qualifications. Paul Leeman also joined Smyth as a part of the deal. However McFall resigned earlier than expected following poor results which allowed Smyth to become manager. He held the management spot from 3 January 2019 until 31 March 2019, when he was replaced with Mick McDermott. Smyth was returned to the role of assistant manager, however he didn't return to the dug-out and left the club in controversial circumstances on 21 May 2019, with Leeman leaving two days later. Smyth voiced his disgust at how he had been treated by the club.

H&W Welders (2019–2022)
On 13 December 2019, it was announced Smyth had returned to manage H&W Welders. 
After around 2 and a half years at his second spell at the club, Smyth was dismissed in August 2022 following a poor start to the season.

Honours
Glentoran
Irish League (2): 1991/92, 2002–03
Irish Cup (2): 2000/01, 2003/04
Irish League Cup (4): 1990/91, 2000/01, 2002/03, 2006/07
Gold Cup (2): 1991/92, 2000/01
County Antrim Shield (2): 2000/01, 2001/02

Glenavon
Irish Cup (1): 1996/97
Gold Cup (1): 1997/98
County Antrim Shield (1): 1995/96
Mid-Ulster Cup (1): 1998/99
Floodlit Cup (1): 1996/97

Crusaders
Irish Cup (1): 2008-09

Managerial statistics
(Statistics apply to league matches only)

References

1969 births
Living people
Association footballers from Northern Ireland
NIFL Premiership players
Ulster Footballers of the Year
Northern Ireland Football Writers' Association Players of the Year
Glenavon F.C. players
Glentoran F.C. players
Crusaders F.C. players
Association football defenders
Ballymena United F.C. players
Glentoran F.C. managers
Football managers from Northern Ireland